The subprefectures of France are the chefs-lieux of arrondissements other than those administered by a prefecture. There are 233 subprefectures out of a total of 332 arrondissements.

The list below shows the sub-prefectures by department.

List of subprefectures

See also
List of arrondissements of France

Notes

References

 
France geography-related lists